The Ishikawajima R-3 was a Japanese training biplane seating two in tandem. Two were built, one of which made a tour of Western and Central Europe in 1932.

Design and development

The R-3 was a small biplane trainer of mixed construction. The wings had wooden structures and were ply-covered around the leading edges and on the undersides. Their covering was completed with fabric over all surfaces. Interplane struts were metal and the fabric-covered ailerons, fitted on both upper and lower wings, had metal structures.

The fuselage was a fabric-covered steel tube structure. The engine mountings accepted several versions of the ADC Cirrus engine, the  Cirrus II,  Cirrus III or  Cirrus Hermes. Instructor and pupil had separate open cockpits in tandem, equipped with dual controls. Its conventional landing gear was also steel, with oleo-rubber landing legs.

Operational history

Only two R-3 are known to have flown but one made an extended tour of Europe in the late summer of 1932, piloted by two Japanese university students supported by the Japan Aeronautical League of Students. For this tour extra tankage increased the R-3's endurance from about 3.5 hrs to 10.5 hrs. Flying from Japan to Western Europe via Siberia, they covered  and visited at least four capitals as well as other cities.

Specifications (with Cirrus Hermes I engine)

References

Biplanes
Single-engined tractor aircraft
1930s Japanese civil trainer aircraft
Trainer aircraft
Ishikawajima aircraft